The Grand Prix de Tennis de Toulouse is a defunct Grand Prix and ATP Tour affiliated tennis tournament played from 1982 to 2000. It was held at the Palais des Sports de Toulouse in Toulouse in France and was played on indoor carpet courts from 1982 to 1993 and on indoor hard courts from 1994 to 2000. Roger Federer recorded the first match win of his career in Toulouse at the 1998 event.

Finals

Singles

Doubles

References

 
Grand Prix tennis circuit
Hard court tennis tournaments
Carpet court tennis tournaments
Indoor tennis tournaments
Defunct tennis tournaments in France
Sport in Toulouse
ATP Tour
Recurring sporting events established in 1982
Recurring sporting events disestablished in 2000
1982 establishments in France
2000 disestablishments in France